Evgeniy Svetlitsa (born February 24, 1983) is a Ukrainian ballet dancer, the soloist at Lviv Theatre of Opera and Ballet. since 2000. Merited Artist of Ukraine since 2015. Winner of the Vadim Pisarev Prize.

Early life and training 
bB
Svetlitsa was born in Lviv, Ukraine. From early childhood, he attended various dance classes. Between 1994 and 1999, Svetlitsa studied at the Lviv State Choreographic School. In 1999 he entered the Kiev University of Culture and Arts. In 2004 he graduated from the university with a degree in choreography. From 2017 to 2018, he studied at the Taras Shevchenko's University in Lugansk, graduated with a master's degree in choreography. Since 2000, Svetlitsa has been affiliated with the Lviv Opera and Ballet Theater.

Repertoire

Roles performed 

Svetlitsa performs leading ballet parts as a soloist not only in the Lviv Opera and Ballet Theater, but also as a guest soloist.

Guest soloist 

 2014 - the ballet Carmen - choreography by Nadezhda Kalinina - Jose
 2016 - the ballet Spartak National Opera of Ukraine - Spartak 
 In 2015 - 2016, he went on tour in the United States as a guest soloist in Swan Lake.
 In 2017, he was invited to Milan, Italy to participate in  Swan Lake ballet along with the school Ukrainian Academy of Ballet. 
 In 2018 he took part in representing the Ukrainian ballet at gala concerts in Brazil, Argentina, Chile, Peru.

Guest soloist in performances of theatres in France, China, Poland, Spain, Portugal, Germany, Switzerland, the Czech Republic, Italy, Sweden, the Netherlands.

Critics call Evgeniy a master of his art and a joy to behold

They also note the beautiful balletic footwork and difficult steps with refined style, performed by Evgeniy.
 
He dances with verve and elasticity

Awards 

Winner of the international ballet competition Arabesque–2008 named after Ekaterina Maximova - Perm, 2008

References 

Dancers from Lviv
Ukrainian ballet dancers
1983 births
21st-century ballet dancers
Living people
Ukrainian male dancers
Recipients of the title of Merited Artist of Ukraine